Tomasz Nałęcz  (born 10 October 1949 in Gołymin) is a Polish historian, leftist politician, former vice-Speaker of the Sejm, a former member of the Social Democracy of Poland party (SdPl)
In the past he used to be member of the communist Polish United Workers' Party (PZPR) (1970–1990) and  later its social-democratic successor, Social Democracy of the Republic of Poland. In the years 1993-2004 he was a prominent member of Labour Union. He left the Labour Union after SdPl was founded by Marek Borowski.

In 2003–2004 Nałęcz was also the chairman of the Sejm's special parliamentary inquiring committee which tried to unravel the Lew Rywin affair.

In December 2009 Nałęcz was selected as the SdPl's candidate for the election due to take place in autumn 2010. However, following the Smolensk plane crash which killed incumbent president Lech Kaczyński and brought forward the election to June, Nałęcz withdrew from the contest.

Works 
 Polska Organizacja Wojskowa 1914–1918 (1984)
 Irredenta polska (1987)
 Rządy Sejmu 1921–1926 (1991)
 Spór o kształt demokracji i parlamentaryzmu w Polsce w latach 1921-1926 (1994)
 Historia XX wieku (2000)

See also
 Politics of Poland 
 List of political parties in Poland
 List of politicians in Poland

References

1949 births
Living people
People from Ciechanów County
20th-century Polish historians
Polish male non-fiction writers
University of Warsaw alumni
Academic staff of the University of Warsaw
Polish United Workers' Party members
Labour Union (Poland) politicians
Deputy Marshals of the Sejm of the Third Polish Republic
Members of the Polish Sejm 1993–1997
Members of the Polish Sejm 2001–2005